Below are the rosters for the 1995 FIFA Women's World Cup tournament in Sweden. The 12 national teams involved in the tournament were required to register a squad of 20 players, including at least two goalkeepers. Only players in these squads were eligible to take part in the tournament.

Group A

Brazil
Head coach: Ademar Fonseca

Germany
Head coach: Gero Bisanz

Japan
Head coach: Tamotsu Suzuki

Sweden
Head coach: Bengt Simonsson

Group B

Canada
Head coach: Sylvie Béliveau

England
Head coach: Ted Copeland

Nigeria
Head coach: Paul Hamilton

Norway
Head coach: Even Pellerud

Group C

Australia
Head coach:  Tom Sermanni

China PR
Head coach: Ma Yuanan

Denmark
Head coach: Keld Gantzhorn

United States
Head coach: Tony DiCicco

References
FIFA Women's World Cup 1995 archived – Teams
Sweden squad statistics
Canada Soccer Association

Squads
FIFA Women's World Cup squads